Bromus danthoniae, the oat brome or three-awned brome, is a species of flowering plant in the family Poaceae, native to Turkey, Cyprus, the Caucasus region, the Middle East, Central Asia, Afghanistan, Pakistan, the western Himalayas, and Tibet. It is rarely discovered growing in other locations, but apparently not in sustained populations. It grows in a wide variety of habitats, and shows morphological variation due to the differing conditions in those habitats.

References

danthoniae
Flora of South European Russia
Flora of the Caucasus
Flora of the Arabian Peninsula
Flora of Western Asia
Flora of Central Asia
Flora of Pakistan
Flora of West Himalaya
Flora of Tibet
Plants described in 1831